Glyphipterix basifasciata is a species of sedge moth in the genus Glyphipterix. It was described by Syuti Issiki in 1931. It is found in Japan (Hokkaido, Honshu, Shikoku) and on the Kuril Islands.

The wingspan is 11–15 mm.

References

Moths described in 1930
Glyphipterigidae
Moths of Japan